Andi Tenri Gusti Hanum Utari Natassa (born 11 August 1992) is an Indonesian-Dutch politician that serve as Indonesia People's Representative Council for South Sulawesi province since 2013 under Indonesian Unity Party, she is also works as a model, actress and TV presenter, who won the title of Puteri Indonesia Pariwisata 2011. She represented Indonesia at the Miss Asia Pacific World 2012 pageant in Seoul, South Korea, where she placed in the Top 15 and also won Best National Costume.

Early life and education
Natassa was born in Makassar, South Sulawesi, from a Dutch father, Andi Thaupan Oddang and Bugis mother, Dewie Yasmin Limpo Aryaliniza. She holds her Master of Business Administration from Faculty of Business of Swiss German University, Alam Sutera, Tangerang – Banten and South Westphalia University of Applied Sciences, North Rhine-Westphalia, Germany. On 2020, She is married with Indonesian National Police, Irwan Anwar.

Pageantry

Puteri Indonesia 2011
Natassa representing South Sulawesi on Puteri Indonesia 2011, where she was crowned as Puteri Indonesia Pariwisata 2011 at the grand finale held in Jakarta Convention Center, Jakarta, Indonesia on October 7, 2011, by the outgoing titleholder of Puteri Indonesia Pariwisata 2010, Alessandra Khadijah Usman of Gorontalo. She is also won Miss Favorite and Miss Talent awards.

Miss Asia Pacific World 2012
As Puteri Indonesia Pariwisata 2011, Natassa represented Indonesia at the Miss Asia Pacific World 2012 pageant in held in Hallyuworld, Seoul, South Korea on June 16, 2012. At the grand finale coronation night, She ended up placed as one of the '"Top 15 semifinalists", she is also won "Best National Costume Awards" and "2nd Runner-up Best Talent" at the pageant.

See also

 Puteri Indonesia 2011
 Miss Asia Pacific World 2012
 Maria Selena Nurcahya
 Fiorenza Liza Elly Purnamasari

References

External links
 Official Puteri Indonesia Official Website
 Andi Tenri Natassa Official Instagram

Living people
1992 births
Puteri Indonesia winners
Indonesian female models
Indonesian beauty pageant winners
Indonesian Christians
Indonesian television actresses
21st-century Indonesian actresses
Indonesian activists
People from South Sulawesi
People from Makassar
People from Jakarta
Indonesian people of Dutch descent
Bugis people
Indo people
Beauty queen-politicians